Ryuso  may refer to:

, the traditional dress of the Ryukyuan people
, a former professional tennis player from Japan